Falcatariella is a genus of moth in the family Cosmopterigidae.

Species
Falcatariella catalaiella Viette, 1949
Falcatariella hirsutella Viette, 1967

References
Natural History Museum Lepidoptera genus database

Cosmopterigidae
Moth genera